"Missing You" is a song by Steve Perry from his album For the Love of Strange Medicine. The song peaked at number 74 on the Billboard Hot 100 in 1994. The song, along with some of its B-sides, later appeared on Perry's compilation album Greatest Hits + Five Unreleased.

Music video
The video was shot in a secret location in Rome, Italy.

Track listing 
 "Missing You" (Steve Perry, Tim Miner) - 3:48
 "Melody" (Perry, Randy Goodrum) - 4:17
 "What Was" (Demo) (Perry, Goodrum) - 3:58
 "It Won't Be You" (Perry, Tony Brock, Adrian Gurvitz) - 3:58
 "Missing You" (Writing Session) (Steve Perry, Tim Miner) - 4:35

References

1994 singles
1994 songs
Steve Perry (musician) songs
Columbia Records singles
Songs written by Steve Perry
RPM Top Singles number-one singles